William L. "Bill" Read was the director of the National Hurricane Center from 2008 to 2012. He has served the United States Navy and the National Weather Service (NWS) during his career. His weather service career began in 1977, and he has worked in Sterling, Virginia, Fort Worth, Texas, San Antonio, Texas, Silver Spring, Maryland, Houston, Texas, and Miami, Florida over the years. He was appointed as the Deputy Director of the National Hurricane Center (NHC) From August 2007 until he was selected for the position of director on January 25, 2008.

Career
Read served in the U.S. Navy, where he served as an on-board meteorologist with the Hurricane Hunters. He began his weather service career in 1977 with the National Weather Service test and evaluation division in Sterling, Virginia. He then served as a forecaster in the Fort Worth and San Antonio, Texas offices before becoming the severe thunderstorm and flash flood program leader at the National Weather Service headquarters in Silver Spring, Maryland.

Read was appointed to direct the Houston/Galveston weather forecast office in 1992 and led it through the National Weather Service modernization and restructuring program of the mid-1990s. He was also part of the Hurricane Liaison Team at the National Hurricane Center in Miami when Hurricane Isabel came ashore on the Outer Banks of North Carolina in September 2003.

Read became the director of the Tropical Prediction Center (TPC), which includes the National Hurricane Center and two other divisions, in Miami, Florida, in January 2008 and served until June 4, 2012 when relieved by Richard Knabb. Read had previously served as the center's acting deputy director between August 2007 and January 2008.

Awards
Read received the National Hurricane Conference Public Education Award in Spring 2004 for hurricane preparedness efforts. Under his leadership, the Houston/Galveston forecast office conducted an annual Houston/Galveston Hurricane Workshop, which was considered the largest meeting of its kind in the United States.

References

American meteorologists
Living people
Texas A&M University alumni
National Weather Service people
Year of birth missing (living people)